Mysłakowice  is a village in Jelenia Góra County, Lower Silesian Voivodeship, in south-western Poland. It is the seat of the administrative district (gmina) called Gmina Mysłakowice. The village has a population of 5,100.

The village dates back to the Middle Ages. The oldest mention comes from the Liber fundationis episcopatus Vratislaviensis from around 1305, when it was part of the Duchy of Jawor of fragmented Piast-ruled Poland.

The village along with the region was annexed by the Kingdom of Prussia in the 18th century. The Prussian field marshal August von Gneisenau owned an estate here, where he lived during his retirement. King Frederick William III of Prussia visited him several times when staying with his brother Prince Wilhelm at Fischbach (today Karpniki), also located in the Jelenia Góra Valley, where the prince had acquired a castle in 1822. After Gneisenau's death the king purchased Erdmannsdorf estate in 1831 and had the manor house redecorated and a new church built by Karl Friedrich Schinkel. The church portico is supported by two marble columns from Pompeii, a gift from Joseph Bonaparte, King of Naples, to Frederick William III. In 1838 the king distributed large parts of his farmland to protestant refugees from the Austrian Zillertal who built Tyrolian style farmhouses that can still be seen. The valley became a royal hideaway, and in 1838 the king purchased nearby Schildau Castle (today Wojanów) for his daughter Princess Louise. His son Frederick William IV bought Erdmannsdorf from his stepmother Auguste, Princess of Liegnitz, and had it enlarged and redecorated in Tudor Revival architecture by Friedrich August Stüler from 1840. Next to the palace a Swiss style farmhouse was built for the Princess of Liegnitz. The park had been designed by Peter Joseph Lenné, offering wide views onto the Giant Mountains; both castle and park do still exist, however used by a school and in rather neglected condition. The famous views are concealed behind trees.

During World War II, in 1945, the Germans established and operated a subcamp of the Gross-Rosen concentration camp in the village, in which around 500 Jewish women worked as forced labour. On 17 February 1945, the prisoners were evacuated to Gross-Rosen and Smržovka.

After the defeat of Nazi Germany in the war, in 1945, the village became again part of Poland. Nowadays an elementary school is located in the historic palace.

Manufacturing Linen has been manufactured in Mysłakowice since 1844. The factory was powered by a 34 ft (10.4) watermill, producing some 30 hp. Twenty years later it was operating over 13,000 spindles. At the Paris World Industrial Exhibition of 1867, the company was awarded a gold medal for their product display. Ten years later the factory was expanded to cope with its 260 mechanical looms. Transport links were improved when the railway line was opened to Jelenia Gora, having its own platform away from the main village station.

Disaster struck during June 1894, when a flood inundated the factory forcing a fourteen-day closure. During WWI it produced sail cloth, towelling, and aircraft cloth. The interwar period was difficult, many local linen factories closing, but they clung on.

At the outbreak of WWII, it became used as a forced labour factory initially with 200 prisoners. (Note at this period of history Mysłakowice part of Germany) Between 1943-4, a further 300 were forced into labour and military production was initiated – both electrical products and anti-aircraft guns. It was liberated on 22 May 1945, by the Red Army, the prisoners released and the locals taking over the factory and named Oezeł (Polish for Eagle)

By 1966 80% of its produce was exported and the factory employed almost 2,700 people. It was run by the unions during the 70’s and 80’s eventually being privatised and eventually listed on the Warsaw stock exchange on 15 February 2007. Unfortunately, it went bankrupt on 1 July 2010.

In June 2012, the company was purchased by new owners and the production of linen fabrics is reactivated as Orzeł Sp. z and continues, but not on such a grand scale as its heyday.

Gallery

References

Villages in Karkonosze County